The Repeal of Certain Laws Act 1772 (12 Geo. III, c. 71) was an Act of the Parliament of Great Britain. It repealed statutes against forestallers and engrossers, including the Forestallers Act 1551.

Notes

Great Britain Acts of Parliament 1772